Maksim Lutskiy (born 9 October 2002) is a Belarusian professional footballer who plays for Molodechno.

References

External links 
 
 

2002 births
Living people
Belarusian footballers
Association football defenders
FC Minsk players
FC Rukh Brest players
FC Naftan Novopolotsk players
FC Molodechno players